{{Infobox character
|name=Robert Garcia
|image=Robert Garcia.png
|caption=Robert Garcia in The King of Fighters 2000
|firstgame=Art of Fighting (1992)
|series=Art of Fighting and The King of Fighters
|creator= Hiroshi Matsumoto
|designer=
|voice=
{{Collapsible list|title=Japanese
|Eiji Yano (AOF)
|Kay Inage (AOF2, KOF '94–95, NeoGeo Battle Coliseum, KOF XI–XIII)
|Mantarou Kouichi (AOF3, KOF '96–2003)
|Masanori Ikeda (AOF anime)
|Hideo Ishikawa (Dengeki Bunko drama CD)
|Go Shinomiya (KOF XIV onwards)
|Kazuhiro Okamoto (KOF for Girls)}}
|origin = Italy
|nationality = Italian
|fighting_style = Kyokugen Karate
}}

 is a video game character created by SNK. Robert stars in the fighting video game Art of Fighting as the supporting character along his best friend Ryo Sakazaki, the lead character. The game has both of them as practitioners of the Kyokugenryu Karate fighting who search for Ryo's younger sister, Yuri Sakazaki, who was kidnapped by a criminal named Mr. Big. He is additionally featured in most of The King of Fighters crossover games, in which starts into the King of Fighters tournament in teams composed of three members. Thus far, he has been a playable character in every edition of KOF except The King of Fighters XI; however, he has been added back in for the PlayStation 2 version of the game.

Robert appeared in the film adaptation of Art of Fighting and the manhua from The King of Fighters. He received mixed critics from video games publication, which praised his design, but some also noted him similar to the Street Fighter main characters. He has also been well received by gamers, appearing in several popularity polls developed by journals and websites.

Creation and design
Robert Garcia was based on the actors Steven Seagal and Andy Garcia. SNK staff members Youichiro Soeda said that Ryo and Robert's debut was unique to other games based on the company because it did not focus on fighting tournaments but instead of the duo's quest to save Yuri Sakazaki.  Artist Shinkiro has expressed difficulties in designing Robert due how he does not understand how rich people behave. In contrast, he had no problem with Ryo. In the making of The King of Fighters Robert was made "the slimmest of them all" in comparison to his original design. His Osaka accent was given to fit Psycho Soldier Sie Kensou and give both of them the traits of comedians. Due to fears of Robert's outfit feeling dated, SNK revised him for The King of Fighters XIV to make him stand out more by giving a new redesign based on an unspecified American actor(Johnny Depp).

In the first Art of Fighting Robert sports a black T-shirt with short sleeves, a brown vest and a gold medallion around the neck. He also wears white pants, white and black shoes and black gloves. He has the same outfit in the following Art of Fighting but without sleeves in his T-shirt. This costume is also featured in the first two King of Fighters as well as The King of Fighters XII and XIII.

In the third Art of Fighting game, Robert is bare-chested under a light blue jacket and does not wear his medallion. He also sports white gloves and brown shoes, but keeps having his white pants. He has the same appearance from The King of Fighters '96 to The King of Fighters '98.

From The King of Fighters '99 to The King of Fighters 2002, Robert wears a similar outfit to the one from the first two Art of Fighting games but with long sleeves and white gloves and shoes. His The King of Fighters 2003 outfit is similar to his Art of Fighting 3 clothes but with white sleeves. In NeoGeo Battle Coliseum and the PlayStation 2 version from The King of Fighters XI, Robert appears as an older version from himself wearing a similar outfit from Art of Fighting 3. The jacket is purple, his gloves are black and his shoes are brown.

There is an Alternate Striker version of Robert in The King of Fighters 2000 called "Another Robert". This Robert wears a white male Kyokugen Karate gi with a blue shirt underneath. His clothing now parodies Ryo Sakazaki while his looks and playstyle parody Street Fighter Alphas Dan Hibiki, right down to his Chouhatsu no Ken that parodies the Chouhatsu Densetsu.

Appearances

In video games

In Art of Fighting, Yuri is kidnapped by the criminal Mr. Big. As such, both Ryo Sakazaki and Robert go to Southtown to interrogate fighters until finding Mr. Big. After defeating Mr. Big, Ryo and Robert face an assassin named Mr.Karate purportedly held Yuri. Ryo nearly finishes him off, but Yuri sneaks in and tells Ryo not to kill him since Mr. Karate is their father, Takuma. The second Art of Fighting game features Robert, Ryo, Takuma and a now fighter Yuri entering into the first King of Fighters tournament held by Geese Howard, the main responsible for the kidnap. In Art of Fighting 3, Robert visits Central America to help Freya Lawrence, a childhood friend, save her brother Wyler, whose demonic power made him go berserk. In his ending, Robert stops Wyler and goes back to Italy. However, before entering into the plane, Yuri accompanies him.

In The King of Fighters series, Takuma, Ryo, and Robert are part of the Art of Fighting Team, but in some games they form different allies. With the arrival of The King of Fighters '99 and its teams of four, Takuma returns to the Art of Fighting team. Though the Garcia Foundation no longer faced liquidation as it did in The King of Fighters 2001, it needed significant help to rebuild its prior fortunes, causing Robert to be absent in The King of Fighters XI. Nevertheless, he is present in the Art of Fighting Team where he fails to stage a date between Ryo and King. He appears in the spin-off The King of Fighters Kyo, in which he helps the main character Kyo Kusanagi into finding his girlfriend Yuki. Alongside an aged Ryo Sakazaki from Buriki One, an aged Robert appears in NeoGeo Battle Coliseum with moves largely from The King of Fighters 2000 and The King of Fighters 2003. In his ending, it is revealed that Robert wishes to stay away from his family business and still work as part of teaching the Kyokugen Ryu. He appears in this form as a hidden character in the PlayStation 2 version of The King of Fighters XI. He returns in The King of Fighters XII onwards as part of the Art of Fighting Team.

In The King of Fighters game without storylines The King of Fighters 2002 and The King of Fighters Neowave the Art of Fighting Team remains as in '94, while in The King of Fighters '98 and The King of Fighters 2002: Unlimited Match, it appears with Yuri taking Takuma's place.

Both of these latest games also feature an "EX" version of Robert with his moves from the Art of Fighting series as a playable character. He is also present in mobile phone games Metal Slug Defense, The King of Fighters '98 Unlimited Match Online and Kimi wa Hero. The dating sim Days of Memories also features him. Although he is not playable in SNK vs. Capcom: SVC Chaos, Robert is often mentioned by other characters and makes a cameo in the endings from Takuma and Ryo. Another cameo of him is in Yuri's ending from SNK Heroines: Tag Team Frenzy. He is also present in as well as the otome game King of Fighters for Girls.

In other media
Besides the games from SNK, Robert also appears in the Art of Fighting anime film from 1993. The plot from film is loosely based on the first Art of Fighting game, with Robert and Ryo searching for Yuri, who has been kidnapped by Mr. Big. However, in the film Mr. Big wants to obtain a diamond held by Ryo and Robert. He is voiced by Masanori Ikeda in the Japanese version of film, and by Nick Sullivan in the English adaptation. Two manga based on the Art of Fighting games also follow Robert's role in the games. Robert is featured in the manhua adaptations from The King of Fighters series, which tell how he participates in the fighting tournaments.

Reception
Robert has been well received by gamers and has appeared in popularity polls from journals and websites. In Gamest'''s 1997 Heroes Collection, Robert was voted as the staff's 46th favorite character. He shared the spot with seven other characters, including Samurai Shodown character, Hattori Hanzo, and Darkstalkers character, Demitri Maximoff. In the January 30, 1995 issue of Gamest magazine in Japan, Robert ranked at No. 36 (tied with Iceman from X-Men: Children of the Atom) in list of Top 50 Characters of 1994.

Videogame publications have commented on Robert's character, adding praise and criticism. Xataka felt that Robert and Ryo shared one of the most unique stories in fighting games as the first Art of Fighting featured them in a quest to save Yuri rather than participating in a fighting game. The same site noted that Robert's origins remained as a mystery to the fanbase. Upon his introduction to The King of Fighter '94 as a member of Team Mexico, the fans believed Robert to be Mexican, but SNK would later reveal he was Italian. Mexican company Evoga originally thought Robert was Mexican due to the team being called Mexico in The King of Fighters '94 yet Art of Fighting 3 revealed he was Italian much to their comical response. David Simpson from AceGamez noted Robert to be very similar to the Street Fighter main characters due to his practice in karate and his relation with Ryo Sakazaki as both are best friends and rivals. Videogamer.com writer Wesley Yin-Poole labeled Robert and Ryo as "two double-hard bastards" and commented they had the best designs from the Art of Fighting series in comparison to the other characters who had "wicked" appearances. Spanner Spencer from Eurogamer added that Robert had the best appearance from all the characters of the Art of Fighting series but labelled him as a "greasy yuppie". Juan E. Hernandez from IGN also compared both Robert and Ryo to Street Fighter as well Dragon Ball characters based on their type of techniques.

Gaming Age writer Jeff Keely criticized Robert's redesign in The King of Fighters '99 as his movesets' input were highly changed, something that might bother his players. In a review from The King of Fighters XI, Eurogamer writer Luke Albiger noted Robert's addition to the game as hidden character is a good way to compensate the several recurring who were absent. However, Kurt Kalata from Armchairempire.com criticized that unlocking Robert in that game was "a pain" due to the difficult challenges the players has to do to unlock him. Greg Kasavin from GameSpot listed his "Haohshokohken" move from Art of Fighting as one of the most influential fireball moves in fighting games' history. Den of Geek listed him as the 54th with the site comparing him to Street Fighter character Ken Masters based on their similar personalities but found that he did have notable actions in SNK's games outside the third Art of Fighting game which the writer felt few fans cared. Despite criticizing the graphics of The King of Fighters XIV, Juan Garcia from IGN praised the redesigns of both Robert and Kyo Kusanagi. Den of Geek also liked the new design of Robert, comparing him comic book hero Tony Stark. Robert has also been described as praised "lavish style is sure to attract many players". Niche Gamer noted that while Robert performs the same fighting style as Yuri and Ryo, each present their own variety of Kyokugen Ryu. Den of Geek noted that the trio and the team in general has been characterized as more comical characters in The King of Fighters than in Art of Fighting though in XI they accidentally created their own rival.

Outside the video games, Robert has been analyzed by his role in the Art of Fighting original video animation. Akemi's Anime World found the character a poser and found his lack of danger the special "cheesy". AnimeOnDVD.com enjoyed the contrast between Ryo and Robert as both "are like night and day in some respects". The character of Dan Hibiki from the Street Fighter Alpha series is deemed as a parody of Ryo due to his similarities with Ryu and Ken, but his design is more similar to Robert's to the point that in SVC Chaos'', characters often confuse Dan with Robert.

References

Art of Fighting characters
Fictional businesspeople in video games
Fictional Italian people in video games
Fictional karateka
Fictional martial artists in video games
Fictional socialites
Male characters in video games
SNK protagonists
The King of Fighters characters
Video game characters introduced in 1992